The 1971 FIBA World Championship for Women (Spanish:1971 Campeonato Mundial Feminino da Fiba) was hosted by Brazil from 1971. The Soviet Union won the tournament, defeating Brazil 88-69 in the final.

Venues

Preliminary round

Group A

|}

Group B

|}

Group C

|}

Classification round

|}

Final round

|}

Final standings

Awards

References
Results (Archived 2009-05-20)

FIBA Women's Basketball World Cup
FIBA
FIBA
FIBA
May 1971 sports events in South America